(also known as The Kamikaze Guy and The Kamikaze Guy: Duel at High Noon, is a 1966 Japanese crime action comedy film directed by Kinji Fukasaku and starring Sonny Chiba.

Plot
Three men involved with the murder of a Taiwanese man receive threatening letters signed with the initials K.M. and a skull. The first recipient, Mr. Yajima, is killed on a ski slope and the prime suspect is the Tokyo pilot Ken Mitarai, also known as "Mr. Toilet". Ballistics clear him but later a diviner tells him that he will travel to Taiwan and the next day he receives a mysterious booking from the dead man Mr. Yajima to fly an MU-2 to Taiwan. The Taiwanese photographer & journalist Koran flies along with him and in the airplane they discover the diviner's body in a trunk belonging to Tianci Rai, the President of Taiwan Tourism and another recipient of the threatening letter.

Upon arriving, they are attacked by Rai's men but manage to escape. Ken is dragged into a brothel, where a kind worker allows him to spend the night. The next day, Ken attempts to leave the country but receives a note from Mr. Kitazawa, the final recipient of the threatening letter, to meet him at the Confucius Temple. Once there, he is told by Mr. Kitazawa that Mr. Kitazawa received the same note, leading them to believe that another attack is imminent. Mr. Kitazawa leaves and his car explodes immediately thereafter.

Koran and Ken confront President Rai, who drugs their drinks to knock them out with plans to have them die in a staged plane crash, but they are saved by a rival journalist of Koran's named Fumio Kuroki, who informs them that the murders relate to 20 billion yen in diamonds seized during the Japanese occupation of Taiwan. Koran and Ken visit a funeral march for Mr. Kitazawa, where they are spotted by President Rai, who sends men to eliminate them. Ken allows them to believe that they have run him and Koran off the road into a gorge, but they secretly hide in the men's trunk, gaining them access to President Rai's hideout, where Koran learns that they are heading to Hell Valley.

President Rai and his men dig up the stolen gems from their hiding spot in Hell Valley but then Rai's assistant Fengying shoots the men and it is revealed that she has been working with Mr. Kitazawa, who faked his own death. They kill President Rai and escape in separate cars. Mr. Kitazawa accidentally kills Fengying while attempting to kill Ken, then escapes into the MU-2 and attempts to smuggle the gems back to Japan. Ken jumps onto the plane and climbs inside while it is in the air, then overpowers Mr. Kitazawa and throws him out.

Ken Mitarai is given a medal at a ceremony in Taiwan, after which Fumio Kuroki admits to him that he is actually the son of the murdered man. Ken and Koran take a flight back to Japan, but when it is announced that the plane will be returning to Taiwan due to bad weather, Ken parachutes out of the plane to avoid returning.

Cast
 Sonny Chiba as Ken Mitarai
 Minoru Ōki as Mr. Kitazawa
 Ken Takakura as Fumio Kuroki
 Gōzō Sōma
 Hideo Murota as detective
 Pailan as Koran
 Hiroko Kuni
 Ririko Sawa

Marketing
The film was marketed as the first of what was planned to be a series of multiple Kamikaze Man films, much in the way that Kinji Fukasaku and Sonny Chiba had previously worked together on multiple Drifting Detective and Vigilante in the Funky Hat films. However, no further films were produced featuring the character Ken Mitarai.

References

External links 
 
 Kamikaze Man: Duel at Noon at allcinema (in Japanese)
 Kamikaze Man: Duel at Noon at Japanese cinema db (in Japanese) 
 Kamikaze Man: Duel at Noon at Kinenote (in Japanese)

1966 films
1960s action comedy films
1960s crime action films
1960s crime comedy films
Films about aviators
Films about journalists
Films directed by Kinji Fukasaku
Films set in Taiwan
Films set in Taipei
Films set in Tokyo
Films set in Yokohama
Films shot in Taiwan
1960s Japanese-language films
Japanese action comedy films
Japanese crime comedy films
Taiwanese-language films
Japanese crime action films
Toei Company films
1960s multilingual films
Japanese multilingual films
1960s Japanese films